63 Mechanised Battalion Group was a unit of the South African Infantry Corps; although it was classed as mechanized infantry, it was a combined arms force consisting of infantry, armour and artillery. Together with 61 Mechanised Battalion Group and 62 Mechanised Battalion Group, these units made up 60 Brigade encompassing battlegroup principles.

Insignia
A chain border on a black shield, three lightning bolts, two swords and the number 63.

History

Origins
63 Mechanised Battalion Group was part of 60 Brigade, based at Lohatla Army Battle School and was formed in 1988 mainly from the operational battalion of 8 South African Infantry Battalion and Ratel 90 Squadrons from 1 Special Service Battalion. Support companies of anti-tank, assault pioneers (sapper),  mortars and their logistical team were also transferred from 1 South African Infantry Battalion in October 1988 to 8 South African Infantry Battalion for integration during a brigade level exercise at Lohatla Army Battle School called Exercise Sweepslag prior to the Group being sent north to South West Africa. The only commander was "Blok " Liebenberg, a veteran of 61 Mech.

Sector 10 South West Africa
63 Mech was seconded to the command of Sector 10 in northern South West Africa in 1989 for its short operational life of about 12 months.

A combined Brigade level exercise with 61 Mech and 62 Mech occurred in the Oshivello area in January 1989.

Operation Merlyn

63 Mech took part in one strategic operation, repulsing a major incursion of SWAPO into Namibia, in April 1989:

 On Saturday 1 April, reports were received of Koevoet, a unit of the South West African Police SWAPOL, taking losses from multiple contacts with SWAPO insurgents.
 On Sunday 2 April 63 Mech now with Koevoet, engaged SWAPO insurgents near Oshikango.  1 Casspir was hit with AK and RPG fire.
 On Monday 3 April, tracking of the insurgents began. Allouette gunship helicopters assisted in visuals. Some 32 SWAPO were killed or captured.
 From Tuesday 4 April, tracking continued around Oshikango.
 On Wednesday 5 April, the unit divided into 3 search groups.
 By Thursday 6 April, the area around Onamagula was being searched, when a column drove into an ambush. A Ratel was lost. About 16 SWAPO were killed in the ensuing battle.

Operation Agree

63 Mech Group withdrew with the majority of SADF Forces from Namibia on 31 November 1989.

Lohatla Army Battle School
From 1989 to 1994, elements of 63 Mech's originating units were deployed internally within South Africa. Some squadrons in Zeerust 2SSB also did riot patrols as required while other squadrons were based in Lohatla and did border duty there after.

The Battle Group experience of 63 Mech continued to be used by 8 SAI, 1 SSB and 2 SSB in annual integrated conventional warfare training at Lohatla Army Battle School.

Battlegroup Organisation
63 Mech Group's structure was designed to be modified as various tasks required.

Deployment in South West Africa
For the specific engagements in Operation Merlyn and Agree however, the unit included:
 Two mechanised infantry companies (A and B Companies) from 8 SAI
 One tank squadron (C Squadron) from the School of Armour – no tanks were ever part of the unit
 One G5 battery (S Battery) from 4 Artillery Regiment – only joined the unit after it returned to Lohathla 
 One armoured car squadron (E Squadron) from 1 SSB, Bloemfontein
 One air defence troop (F Squadron) from 6th Light Anti-Aircraft Regiment or 10th Anti-Aircraft Regiment
 One engineer troop
 One Support Company which included mortar, antitank and assault pioneer platoons

Exercises at Lohatla Army Battle School
From 1990, 63 Mech was activated annually only for joint training exercises where 8 SAI was the lead entity:
By 1991, Rooikat armoured cars and Ratel ZT3s were added to these exercises at Lohatla Army Battle School.

Notable exercises included Excalibur 1 and 2 as well as Blits 2.

SANDF Rethink
By 1994, the 63 Mech nomenclature was totally abandoned. The battlegroup principles however continue to be utilised in the current SANDF's training program as and when the need arises.

Notes

References

Further reading
 
 
 
 

Serfontein C (Brig); drafted in July 1990, Namibie Operasie Merlyn. Die laaste geveg en finale ontrekking van die SA Weermag aan Namibie
52 CHARLIE: A Ratel 90 Gunner's Story Recollections of 1989 as recalled in 2010 Jacques Myburgh (86270568BG Trooper J. Myburgh, 1 SSB and 63 Mech Bn Gp) 2014
 

Battalions of South Africa
Military units and formations established in 1989
Military units and formations disestablished in 1994
Military units and formations of South Africa in the Border War